Bowen Court is a bungalow court located at 539 E. Villa St. in Pasadena, Los Angeles County, California. The court includes 23 bungalows arranged in an "L" shape and is one of the largest bungalow courts in southern California. Built from 1910 to 1912, Bowen Court is the oldest bungalow court in Pasadena. The court was designed by Arthur and Alfred Heineman, who planned the court around a Craftsman style courtyard.

The court was listed on the National Register of Historic Places on June 17, 1982.

See also
National Register of Historic Places listings in Pasadena, California

References

Bungalow courts
Bungalow architecture in California
Houses in Pasadena, California
Houses completed in 1912
Houses on the National Register of Historic Places in California
National Register of Historic Places in Pasadena, California
American Craftsman architecture in California
1912 establishments in California